Portia Robinson  ( Ferguson; 26 August 1926 – 3 February 2023) was an Australian historian. She was an associate professor at Macquarie University, retiring in 1998. Robinson was appointed a Member of the Order of Australia in 1993 "[f]or service to education, particularly in the field of Australian colonial history".

Works

References 

1926 births
2023 deaths
20th-century Australian historians
Academic staff of Macquarie University
Australian women historians
Members of the Order of Australia
20th-century Australian women